The provinces of Burkina Faso are divided into 351 departments (as of 2014 and since local elections of 2012), whose urbanized areas (cities, towns and villages) are grouped into the same commune (municipality) with the same name as the department. The department also covers rural areas (including national natural parks) that are not governed locally by the elected municipal council of the commune (presided by its mayor, with representants elected for each village or urban sector), but by the state represented at departmental level by a prefect (supervized by the haut-commissaire of its province, themself assisted by a general secretary and acting under the hierarchic authority the governor of its region, all of them being nominated by the national government).

Status of communes 
The 351 communes (municipalities) created for each one of these departments have three kinds of status :
 49 urban communes are grouping their main city/town (subdivided into urban sectors) and all other administrative villages in their department; in these 49 urban communes, the main city or town is subdivided into urban sectors (within the two communes with special status, each urban sector of the capital city belong to only one arrondissement, which may also include other surrounding villages outside the capital city).  These 49 urban communes include:
 the capital town (or city) of each one of the 45 provinces (and of the 13 regions); among them, 2 urban communes have a particular status: the Ouagadougou and Bobo-Dioulasso departments, that are further subdivided into "arrondissements";
 the commune of 4 additional departments, whose capitals are now large towns covering their respective urban areas (subdivided into urban sectors rather than former separate villages) : Bittou, Garango, Niangoloko and Pouytenga.
 302 rural communes are grouping all administrative villages in their department. Their capitals are still considered officially as "villages", because they also cover a large rural area with dispersed population (with some exceptions expansion, notably around the largest cities of the country, whose urbanized agglomerations are expanding towards the rural area of their bordering departments and absorbing their villages; some of these departments may become urban communes as well, integrating their former villages into urban sectors of their reformed commune).

Departments (or communes) generally have the same name as their capital city or town, with a few exceptions (for historical reasons). For the local elections in 2012, communes were created in each department that still did not have one (village councils were kept but operate at advisory level under the supervision of their commune: each administrative village or urban sector elects at least 2 seats in the municipal council of their commune; for other elections at regional or national level, the smallest electoral circonscription is the whole department).

List of departments or communes by region and by province 
 Type of departments : (rur.) rural commune ; (urb.) urban commune ; (urb.p.s.) urban commune with particular status (subdivided in arrondissements).

 Centre Region 

 Kadiogo Province

 Komki-Ipala (rur.)
 Komsilga (rur.)
 Koubri (rur.)
 Ouagadougou (urb.p.s.) (provincial, regional and national capital)
 Pabré (rur.)
 Saaba (rur.)
 Tanghin-Dassouri (rur.)
 Plateau-Central Region 

 Ganzourgou Province

 Boudry (rur.)
 Kogho (rur.)
 Méguet (rur.)
 Mogtédo (rur.)
 Salogo (rur.)
 Zam (rur.)
 Zorgho (urb.) (provincial capital)
 Zoungou (rur.)

 Kourwéogo Province

 Boussé (urb.) (provincial capital)
 Laye (rur.)
 Niou (rur.)
 Sourgoubila (rur.)
 Toéghin (rur.)

 Oubritenga Province

 Absouya (rur.)
 Dapélogo (rur.)
 Loumbila (rur.)
 Nagréongo (rur.)
 Ourgou-Manéga (rur.)
 Ziniaré (urb.) (provincial and regional capital)
 Zitenga (rur.)
 Centre-Nord Region 

 Bam Province

 Bourzanga (rur.)
 Guibaré (rur.)
 Kongoussi (urb.) (provincial capital)
 Nasséré (rur.)
 Rollo (rur.)
 Rouko (rur.)
 Sabcé (rur.)
 Tikaré (rur.)
 Zimtenga (rur.)

 Namentenga Province

 Boala (rur.)
 Boulsa (urb.) (provincial capital)
 Bouroum (rur.)
 Dargo (rur.)
 Nagbingou (rur.)
 Tougouri (rur.)
 Yalgo (rur.)
 Zéguédéguin (rur.)

 Sanmatenga Province

 Barsalogho (rur.)
 Boussouma (rur.)
 Dablo (rur.)
 Kaya (urb.) (provincial and regional capital)
 Korsimoro (rur.)
 Mané (rur.)
 Namissiguima (rur.)
 Pensa (rur.)
 Pibaoré (rur.)
 Pissila (rur.)
 Ziga (rur.)
 Nord Region 

 Loroum Province

 Banh (rur.)
 Ouindigui (rur.)
 Sollé (rur.)
 Titao (urb.) (provincial capital)

 Passoré Province

 Arbollé (rur.)
 Bagaré (rur.)
 Bokin (rur.)
 Gomponsom (rur.)
 Kirsi (rur.)
 Lâ-Todin (rur.)
 Pilimpikou (rur.)
 Samba (rur.)
 Yako (urb.) (provincial capital)

 Yatenga Province

 Barga (rur.)
 Kaïn (rur.)
 Kalsaka (rur.)
 Kossouka (rur.)
 Koumbri (rur.)
 Namissiguima (rur.)
 Ouahigouya (urb.) (provincial and regional capital)
 Oula (rur.)
 Rambo (rur.)
 Séguénéga (rur.)
 Tangaye (rur.)
 Thiou (rur.)
 Zogoré (rur.)

 Zondoma Province

 Bassi (rur.)
 Boussou (rur.)
 Gourcy (urb.) (provincial capital)
 Léba (rur.)
 Tougo (rur.)
 Sahel Region 

 Oudalan Province

 Déou (rur.)
 Gorom-Gorom (urb.) (provincial capital)
 Markoye (rur.)
 Oursi (rur.)
 Tin-Akoff (rur.)

 Séno Province

 Bani (rur.)
 Dori (urb.) (provincial and regional capital)
 Falagountou (rur.)
 Gorgadji (rur.)
 Sampelga (rur.)
 Seytenga (rur.)

 Soum Province

 Arbinda (rur.)
 Baraboulé (rur.)
 Diguel (rur.)
 Djibo (urb.) (provincial capital)
 Kelbo (rur.)
 Koutougou (rur.)
 Nassoumbou (rur.)
 Pobé-Mengao (rur.)
 Tongomayel (rur.)

 Yagha Province

 Boundoré (rur.)
 Mansila (rur.)
 Sebba (urb.) (provincial capital)
 Solhan (rur.)
 Tankougounadié (rur.)
 Titabé (rur.)
 Est Region 

 Gnagna Province

 Bilanga (rur.)
 Bogandé (urb.) (provincial capital)
 Coalla (rur.)
 Liptougou (rur.)
 Manni (rur.)
 Piéla (rur.)
 Thion (rur.)

 Gourma Province

 Diabo (rur.)
 Diapangou (rur.)
 Fada N′Gourma (urb.) (provincial and regional capital)
 Matiacoali (rur.)
 Tibga (rur.)
 Yamba (rur.)

 Komondjari Province

 Bartiébougou (rur.)
 Foutouri (rur.)
 Gayéri (urb.) (provincial capital)

 Kompienga Province

 Kompienga (rur.)
 Madjoari (rur.)
 Pama (urb.) (provincial capital)

 Tapoa Province

 Botou (rur.)
 Diapaga (urb.) (provincial capital)
 Kantchari (rur.)
 Logobou (rur.)
 Namounou (rur.)
 Partiaga (rur.)
 Tambaga (rur.)
 Tansarga (rur.)
 Centre-Est Region 

 Boulgou Province

 Bagré (rur.)
 Bané (rur.)
 Béguédo (rur.)
 Bissiga (rur.)
 Bittou (urb.)
 Boussouma (rur.)
 Garango (urb.)
 Komtoèga (rur.)
 Niaogho (rur.)
 Tenkodogo (urb.) (provincial and regional capital)
 Zabré (rur.)
 Zoaga (rur.)
 Zonsé (rur.)

 Koulpélogo Province

 Comin-Yanga (rur.)
 Dourtenga (rur.)
 Lalgaye (rur.)
 Ouargaye (urb.) (provincial capital)
 Sangha (rur.)
 Soudougui (rur.)
 Yargatenga (rur.)
 Yondé (rur.)

 Kouritenga Province

 Andemtenga (rur.)
 Baskouré (rur.)
 Dialgaye (rur.)
 Gounghin (rur.)
 Kando (rur.)
 Koupéla (urb.) (provincial capital)
 Pouytenga (urb.)
 Tensobentenga (rur.)
 Yargo (rur.)
 Centre-Sud Region 

 Bazèga Province

 Doulougou (rur.)
 Gaongo (rur.)
 Ipelcé (rur.)
 Kayao (rur.)
 Kombissiri (urb.) (provincial capital)
 Saponé (rur.)
 Toécé (rur.)

 Nahouri Province

 Guiaro (rur.)
 Pô (urb.) (provincial capital)
 Tiébélé (rur.)
 Zecco (rur.)
 Ziou (rur.)

 Zoundwéogo Province

 Béré (rur.)
 Bindé (rur.)
 Gogo (rur.)
 Gomboussougou (rur.)
 Guiba (rur.)
 Manga (urb.) (provincial and regional capital)
 Nobéré (rur.)
 Centre-Ouest Region 

 Boulkiemdé Province

 Bingo (rur.)
 Imasgo (rur.)
 Kindi (rur.)
 Kokologho (rur.)
 Koudougou (urb.) (provincial and regional capital)
 Nanoro (rur.)
 Nandiala (rur.)
 Pella (rur.)
 Poa (rur.)
 Ramongo (rur.)
 Sabou (rur.)
 Siglé (rur.)
 Soaw (rur.)
 Sourgou (rur.)
 Thyou (rur.)

 Sanguié Province

 Dassa (rur.)
 Didyr (rur.)
 Godyr (rur.)
 Kordié (rur.)
 Kyon (rur.)
 Pouni (rur.)
 Réo (urb.) (provincial capital)
 Ténado (rur.)
 Zamo (rur.)
 Zawara (rur.)

 Sissili Province

 Biéha (rur.)
 Boura (rur.)
 Léo (urb.) (provincial capital)
 Nébiélianayou (rur.)
 Niabouri (rur.)
 Silly (rur.)
 Tô (rur.)

 Ziro Province

 Bakata (rur.)
 Bougnounou (rur.)
 Cassou (rur.)
 Dalo (rur.)
 Gao (rur.)
 Sapouy (urb.) (provincial capital)
 Hauts-Bassins Region 

 Houet Province

 Bama (rur.)
 Bobo-Dioulasso (urb.p.s.) (provincial and regional capital)
 Dandé (rur.)
 Faramana (rur.)
 Fô (rur.)
 Karangasso-Sambla (rur.)
 Karangasso-Vigué (rur.)
 Koundougou (rur.)
 Léna (rur.)
 Padéma (or Badéma, Badéna) (rur.)
 Péni (rur.)
 Satiri (rur.)
 Toussiana (rur.)

 Kénédougou Province

 Banzon (rur.)
 Djigouéra (rur.)
 Kangala (rur.)
 Kayan (rur.)
 Koloko (rur.)
 Kourinion (rur.)
 Kourouma (rur.)
 Morolaba (rur.)
 N′Dorola (rur.)
 Orodara (urb.) (provincial capital)
 Samogohiri (rur.)
 Samorogouan (rur.)
 Sindo (rur.)

 Tuy Province

 Békuy (rur.)
 Béréba (rur.)
 Boni (rur.)
 Founzan (rur.)
 Houndé (urb.) (provincial capital)
 Koti (rur.)
 Koumbia (rur.)
 Boucle du Mouhoun Region 

 Balé Province

 Bagassi (rur.)
 Bana (rur.)
 Boromo (urb.) (provincial capital)
 Fara (rur.)
 Oury (rur.)
 Pâ (rur.)
 Pompoï (rur.)
 Poura (rur.)
 Siby (rur.)
 Yaho (rur.)

 Banwa Province

 Balavé (rur.)
 Kouka (rur.)
 Sami (rur.)
 Sanaba (rur.)
 Solenzo (urb.) (provincial capital)
 Tansila (rur.)

 Kossi Province

 Barani (rur.)
 Bomborokui (rur.)
 Bourasso (rur.)
 Djibasso (rur.)
 Dokuy (rur.)
 Doumbala (rur.)
 Kombori (rur.)
 Madouba (rur.)
 Nouna (urb.) (provincial capital)
 Sono (rur.)

 Mouhoun Province

 Bondokuy (rur.)
 Dédougou (urb.) (provincial and regional capital)
 Douroula (rur.)
 Kona (rur.)
 Ouarkoye (rur.)
 Safané (rur.)
 Tchériba (rur.)

 Nayala Province

 Gassam (rur.)
 Gossina (rur.)
 Kougny (rur.)
 Toma (urb.) (provincial capital)
 Yaba (rur.)
 Yé (rur.)

 Sourou Province

 Di (rur.)
 Gomboro (rur.)
 Kassoum (rur.)
 Kiembara (rur.)
 Lanfièra (rur.)
 Lankoué (rur.)
 Toéni (rur.)
 Tougan (urb.) (provincial capital)
 Cascades Region 

 Comoé Province

 Banfora (urb.) (provincial and regional capital)
 Bérégadougou (rur.)
 Mangodara (rur.)
 Moussodougou (rur.)
 Niangoloko (urb.)
 Ouo (rur.)
 Sidéradougou (rur.)
 Soubakaniédougou (rur.)
 Tiéfora (rur.)

 Léraba Province

 Dakoro (rur.)
 Douna (rur.)
 Kankalaba (rur.)
 Loumana (rur.)
 Niankorodougou (rur.)
 Ouéléni (rur.)
 Sindou (urb.) (provincial capital)
 Wolonkoto (rur.)
 Sud-Ouest Region 

 Bougouriba Province

 Bondigui (rur.)
 Diébougou (urb.) (provincial capital)
 Dolo (rur.)
 Iolonioro (rur.)
 Tiankoura (rur.)

 Ioba Province

 Dano (urb.) (provincial capital)
 Dissin (rur.)
 Guéguéré (rur.)
 Koper (rur.)
 Niégo (rur.)
 Oronkua (rur.)
 Ouessa (rur.)
 Zambo (rur.)

 Noumbiel Province

 Batié (urb.) (provincial capital)
 Boussoukoula (rur.)
 Kpuéré (rur.)
 Legmoin (rur.)
 Midebdo (rur.)

 Poni Province

 Bouroum-Bouroum (rur.)
 Bousséra (rur.)
 Djigoué (rur.)
 Gaoua (urb.) (provincial and regional capital)
 Gbomblora (rur.)
 Kampti (rur.)
 Loropéni (rur.)
 Malba (rur.)
 Nako (rur.)
 Périgban (or Pérignan) (rur.)

References

See also
 Provinces of Burkina Faso
 Regions of Burkina Faso

 
Burkina Faso geography-related lists
Subdivisions of Burkina Faso
Burkina Faso, Departments
Burkina Faso 3
Departments, Burkina Faso